Neville Forge (born 10 April 1940) is a former  Australian rules footballer who played with South Melbourne in the Victorian Football League (VFL).

Forge was recruited to South Melbourne from Albury in the Ovens and Murray Football League on the recommendation of former South Melbourne player, Fred Goldsmith who was coaching Albury at the time.

Notes

External links 

Living people
1940 births
Australian rules footballers from New South Wales
Sydney Swans players